"A Stillness" is a song by New Zealand post-punk revival band The Naked and Famous, from their second studio album In Rolling Waves. The song, was released for streaming on August 28, 2013.

Premise 
The song is about getting ahead of worry and psychoanalysis, re-encountering love, stability, safety, tranquility, not straying and combatting the sense of despair that a person may have.

Live performances 
Following the release of the album, the song has been used as the first tune performed at live shows.

Critical reception 
EastScene describes the song as one having a galaxial theme of discovery while nonetheless remaining grounded, as the keyboards and percussion instruments stray in opposing paths while veering along the same trail.  Christopher Sheridan of Band Wagon Magazine describes the song as starting off slowly while rising up gradually and setting the tone for the momentum the band is known for, with Lauren Brown from Rock on Philly comparing lead vocalist Alisa Xayalith's resonant vocals to those of Yeah Yeah Yeahs front woman Karen Orzolek.  Brown went on to say that the song did not portray the ensemble's electropop talent.

Personnel 
Credits adapted from the liner notes of In Rolling Waves.
 Billy Bush – engineer
 John Catlin – engineer (mix)
 Joe LaPorta – mastered
 Alan Moulder – mixing
 Thom Powers – producer
 David Schwerkolt – engineer (assistant)

References 

The Naked and Famous songs
2013 songs